DC Archive Editions are hardcover editions reprinting stories from currently DC Comics-owned properties of Golden Age and Silver Age comics, regardless of whether DC was the original publisher of those works. Will Eisner's The Spirit Archives, T.H.U.N.D.E.R Agents Archives, Mad Archives and Elfquest Archives are not technically part of the DC Archive Editions series (typified by a cover format consisting of a black pinstriped background into which a color v-shaped area is overlaid from the top, reaching almost to the bottom for all of the books) as they do not own those properties/characters, but are licensing them from the copyright holders (in the case of Mad, the property is owned by DC's parent company, but not DC themselves).
These non-DC Archive Editions* series are included in the list here.

 Initial copies of Golden Age Hawkman Volume 1 were printed with the story on pages 131–136 out of sequence (i.e., 1, 3, 2, 5, 4, and 6). Corrected copies were made by removing those pages and tipping in the corrected sequence. Both versions thus say "First printing" in the indicia. For a while, DC would switch out copies if they were sent in.

See also
Showcase Presents

DC Archive Editions
Comic book collection books
DC Comics lines